SHM may stand for:

Nanki–Shirahama Airport (IATA: SHM), in Wakayama, Japan
Prefix for several shared memory functions in Unix-like systems (shmat, shmctl, etc.) 
Shek Mun station, Hong Kong, MTR station code
Simple harmonic motion, in physics
Somatic hypermutation, allowing immune system adaptation
Structural health monitoring of engineering structures
Supporting Healthy Marriage,  US study
Swedish House Mafia, a house music supergroup from Stockholm

See also
shm-reduplication, an example of reduplication in linguistics